Mihail Eduardovich Sokolov (born 1959) is a Russian scientist and surgeon who is Deputy director of the Institute for Mathematical Studies of Complex Systems of Moscow State University, Adviser to the rector of Moscow State University.

Biography 
Mihail Sokolov was born July 11, 1959 in Tula. He graduated from the Russian National Research Medical University. He defended (1996) the dissertation «System approach and control processes in obliterating diseases of limb arteries: An experimental clinical study» for the degree of Doctor of Medical Sciences.

Received the title of Professor. Surgeon of the highest category. Medical Robot Developer.

He has been working at Moscow State University since 1997: Associate professor, Professor at the MSU Faculty of Fundamental Medicine, Head of the department at the MSU Faculty of Public Administration, Vice Rector, Advisor to the Rector of Moscow State University, Director of the MSU Branch in Sevastopol (2012-2015).

Scientific interests: development of technologies and the creation of prototypes of artificial tactile mechanoreceptors for endoscopy; organization of the production of an automated diagnostic and medical complex for maintaining human life; medical robotization.

The author of 6 monographs and more than 100 publications. Sokolov has more than 20 patents and 18 certificates of registration of software rights. Head of 7 Ph.D. dissertations and a Dr.Sc. dissertation consultant.

Honorary Doctor of Sōka University (2008).

References

Literature

External links 
  
  
  
  
  
  
  

 
Academic staff of Moscow State University
1959 births
Living people